Walter Augustus Horner (August 20, 1876 – March 28, 1950) was an American farmer and politician who served in the Virginia House of Delegates.

References

External links 

1876 births
1950 deaths
Members of the Virginia House of Delegates
20th-century American politicians